Edward Felix Norton  (21 February 1884 – 3 November 1954) was a British army officer and mountaineer.

Early life 
He attended Charterhouse School and the Royal Military Academy, Woolwich, and then joined artillery units in India and served in World War I. He had been introduced to mountain climbing at the home in the Alps of his grandfather, Alfred Wills.

Career

Mountaineering 
His experience led to his taking part in the British 1922 Everest and 1924 Everest expeditions, reaching high elevations both years. His height of —reached without using oxygen on the Great Couloir route—was a world altitude record which stood for nearly 30 years, only being surpassed during the unsuccessful Swiss expedition of 1952.

In 1924, he took over leadership of the expedition when General Charles Granville Bruce fell ill, and Norton was praised for handling affairs in the aftermath of the disappearance of George Mallory and Andrew Irvine.

Military career 
He served at Staff Colleges in India and England, and commanded the Royal Artillery and later the Madras District in the 1930s. From 1940 to 1941, he was acting governor and then Commander-in-Chief of Hong Kong.

He retired in 1942, after a near fatal riding accident.

Later years 
From 1952 until 1953, he advised John Hunt that previous Everest assault camps had been too low, and in 1953 it should be on or very close under the Southern Summit.

References

Footnotes

Major Work

Mountaineering
The Fight for Everest 1924 (1925) Published by Longmans, Green (1925)

Bibliography 

 

1884 births
1954 deaths
British Army generals of World War II
British Army lieutenant generals
British Army personnel of World War I
British mountain climbers
Companions of the Distinguished Service Order
English mountain climbers
Governors of Hong Kong
Graduates of the Royal Military Academy, Woolwich
People educated at Charterhouse School
Recipients of the Military Cross
Royal Artillery officers